Irina Olegovna Grigorieva is a Russian former footballer who played as a midfielder. She played for FC Lyon, Spartak Moscow, CSK VVS Samara and Nadezhda Noginsk.

Internationally, Grigorieva represented three different teams. She first played for the Soviet Union in 1990, before the dissolution of the Soviet Union in 1991. During 1992, she played for the CIS, a brief association of former Soviet republics. Subsequently, she represented Russia.

She captained Russia at the 1999 FIFA Women's World Cup, where she scored in the third match against Canada, as well as at the 1997 and 2001 editions of the UEFA Women's Championship.

The Russian Football Union has described her as: "the best football player in the history of Russia".

Early life
Grigorieva grew up in Yasenevo District with her cook mother and mechanic father. She was a childhood figure skater, who later progressed to playing field hockey and bandy.

Club career
After Grigorieva's works hockey team "Stankoagregat" were defeated by their rivals in a national Cup final, the team coach suggested forming a football team instead. The club underwent name changes due to sponsorship and quickly became competitive in the Soviet women's football championship. Grigorieva was sent off and banned when her retaliation to being fouled brought about a mass brawl in a game against Nyva Baryshivka.

In the inaugural 1992 edition of the Russian Women's Football Championship, Grigorieva scored 22 goals for champions Spartak-Interros. She added two decisive goals in the 1992 Russian Women's Cup final as her club secured a League and Cup "double".

Grigorieva transferred to FC Lyon in 1993, where she lodged with team mate Cécile Locatelli. She helped the team secure the 1992–93 Division 1 Féminine title and was named the Best Foreign Player of the Year. However, an anterior cruciate ligament injury brought about her return to Russia, where she accepted an offer to join CSK VVS Samara.

With CSK, Grigorieva and her team mates trained full-time while nominally employed as ensigns in the Russian Ground Forces. She spent half a season with Turbine Potsdam in 1994–95, but otherwise remained with CSK until their dissolution in 2004. In total, she made 181 league appearances and scored 77 goals for CSK VVS Samara.

In summer 2004 Grigorieva joined FC Energy Voronezh and she represented the club in the 2004–05 UEFA Women's Cup.

International career
Grigorieva was called up to the Soviet Union women's national football team within a year of taking up organized football. With the Russia women's national football team she was the captain of the team at UEFA Women's Euro 1997. Although she scored against France, the team underperformed, losing all three matches and failing to progress from the group stage.

At the 1999 FIFA Women's World Cup draw in February of that year, Grigorieva represented her country when she was picked to play in a FIFA World XI against the United States in a showpiece exhibition game in San Jose, California. She appeared as a substitute for Bettina Wiegmann in the World XI's 2–1 win.

She had helped Russia qualify for their first FIFA Women's World Cup by scoring in the qualification playoff win over Finland. A tournament preview on the SoccerTimes.com website described her as a skilful center midfielder who possessed "the keys to the [Russian] attack". She was among several Russian squad members who had been converted to soccer from other sports.

In Russia's 5–0 Group C win over Japan at the final tournament, a notably unselfish display from Grigorieva saw her pass up goal-scoring opportunites for herself while serving three assists to team mates. She opened the scoring herself in the 4–1 win over Canada which secured qualification for the quarter finals, after which she said: "Sydney is looming, dominating all our thoughts". The team's defensive approach in their 2–0 quarter final defeat by China nullified the attacking threat of "Russia's strongest attacker" Grigorieva.

Post-playing career

After retirement, she worked as a social worker.

Honours

CSK VVS Samara

Russian Women's Football Championship: 1992, 1994, 1996, 2001
Russian Women's Cup: 1994

Lyon

Division 1 Féminine: 1993

References

External links

1972 births
People from Moscow
Russian women's footballers
1999 FIFA Women's World Cup players
Women's association football midfielders
Nadezhda Noginsk players
FC Spartak Moscow (women) players
CSK VVS Samara (women's football club) players
Russian Women's Football Championship players
Olympique Lyonnais Féminin players
Division 1 Féminine players
Russia women's international footballers
Expatriate women's footballers in France
Russian expatriate sportspeople in France
Russian bandy players
Soviet women's footballers
Soviet Union women's international footballers
Dual internationalists (women's football)
FIFA Century Club
Living people
Russian expatriate women's footballers
Expatriate women's footballers in Germany
Russian expatriate sportspeople in Germany
Frauen-Bundesliga players
1. FFC Turbine Potsdam players